Benito Ramírez can refer to:
 Benito Ramírez, a Spanish footballer
 CPA Benito Ramírez, a town in Cuba